Hot spell may refer to:

A heat wave
Hot Spell, a 1958 film
"Hot Spells", an episode of Darkwing Duck